Following is a list of code names that have been used to identify computer hardware and software products while in development.  In some cases, the code name became the completed product's name, but most of these code names are no longer used once the associated products are released.

Symbol and numbers
 19H1 — Windows 10 version 1903
 4Course — Sun 4 × 1.05 GB 3.5" SCSI2 disks in Dinnerbox+ package
 83% — UHU Linux 1.1 Beta 4

A

 Alder — Windows CE 2.0
 Apollo — Windows Phone 8
Astro — Android 0.9 (internal codename)
 Aurora — Windows Small Business Server 2011 Essentials
 Aurora — Sun SPARCstation 5

B

 B52 Rock Lobster — Commodore Amiga 500
 Baikal — ASP Linux 7.2
 Bali — BL440ZX
 Bali — Sun JavaEngine 1
 Bamboo — Mandrake Linux 9.1
 Banias — Intel 1st generation Pentium M processors
 Banister — Intel 440MX
 Bantam — Sun SBus FDDI
 Barak — StartCom Linux 4.0.0-AS
 Barcelona — AMD Opteron "K10" architecture
 Barney — Sun StorEdge T3 chassis
 Barracuda — Opera 11.10 browser (Also A hard drive series from Seagate)
 Bart — Sun SPARCCompilers 5.x
 Barton — AMD Athlon XP
 Batman — Sun ATM SBus card
 Batphone — Sun SBus card for ISDN
 Beagle — Novell Linux desktop search and metadata technology due with SLES 10
 Becks — Apple Macintosh II
 Beetle — Sun SunRay 100
 Beefy Miracle — Fedora Linux 17
 Bender — Android 1.0/1.1 (internal codename)
 BHA — Apple Power Macintosh 7100/66 ("Butt Head Astronomer" Carl Sagan)
 Big Electric Cat — Adobe Photoshop 4.0
 Big Foot — Quantum 5.25" hard drive
 Big Sur — Apple Font Pack
 Bigfish — Sun StorEdge 9900 series
 Bigmac — Sun 100 MBit Ethernet SBus card
 BigTop — Sun SunPro 3.0 compilers
 Biltmore — Red Hat Linux 4.2
 Bimini — BI440ZX
 Birch — Microsoft Windows CE 2.11
 Bismillah — Turkix Linux 1.0
 Blackbeard — Sun PCI SCSI hardware RAID controller
 Blackbird — Apple Macintosh IIfx
 Blackbird — Apple Macintosh PowerBook 540
 Blackbird — Sun UltraSPARC II
 Blackbird+ — Sun UltraSPARC II 250 MHz
 Blackbird LC — Apple Macintosh PowerBook 520/520c
 Blackford — Intel 5000P chipset
 Blackjack — Sun Netra E1 PCI System Expander
 Bladerunner — nVidia GeForce 2 Ultra
 Bladerunner — Sun GUI for Jumpstart profiles
 Blaze — Sun UltraSPARC II
 Blaze — Adobe Flash CS3
 Blue — Windows 8.1
 Blue — Windows Phone 8.1
 Blue Box — Apple Mac OS compatibility layer for Rhapsody
 Bluebird — Mandrake Linux 8.2
 Bluedog — Sun HPC ClusterTools 3.1
 Blueringer — Sun 4MB SBus Token Ring
 Blueringer II — Sun 16MB SBus Token Ring
 Blugu — Apple Workgroup Server 60, 80
 Bo — Debian GNU/Linux 1.3
 BOB W — Apple Macintosh PowerBook Duo 210/230
 Bon Echo — Mozilla Firefox 2.0
 Bongo — Apple Macintosh Performa/Power Macintosh 5200
 Bonjour — Turkix Linux 10.0a
 Bordeaux — Fedora Core 5 Linux
 Borealis — Sun cPCI QuadFastEthernet
 Borrow — Blag Linux 10000
 Braun — Sun JavaStation
 BraveHawk 200 DC3 — HP-9000 K370/K570 - 898
 Brazil — Apple Macintosh IIvx
 Brazil 32 — Apple Macintosh Performa 600
 BreadboxA — Sun enclosure for Netra NFS
 Breezy Badger — Ubuntu 5.10
 Brick — Apple Aluminum MacBook Line Late 2008
 Bride of Buster — Apple Mac OS 8.1
 Brimstone — Adobe Photoshop 2.5 for Windows
 Broadwater — Intel P965 chipset
 Broadwater G — Intel G965 chipset
 Broadway — Sun StorEdge Media Central
 Brokenboring — KDE 3.2
 Brookdale — Intel i845 chipset
 Brooklyn — Apple IIx
 Brooks — Apple Macintosh PowerBook 160
 Brugge — MCNLive CD Linux released May 3, 2005
 Bulldozer — codename for the server and desktop processors released on October 12, 2011 by AMD
 Bullfrog — Sun 4 mm DAT with stacker
 Bullwinkle — Sun SCSI Expansion Pedestal
 Bulverde — Intel PXA270 processor
 Burnaby — XMetaL 3.0
 Buzz — Debian GNU/Linux 1.1

C

 CADET — IBM 1620
 Cairo — Microsoft Windows NT 4.0
 Calais — Sun Next generation JavaStation
 Calexico — Intel PRO/Wireless 2100B
 Calistoga — Intel chipsets for Napa platforms
 Calvin — Sun SPARCStation 2
 Camaro — AMD Mobile Duron
 Cambridge — Fedora Linux 10
 Camelot — Sun product family name for Arthur, Excalibur, Morgan
 Camino — Intel i820 chipset
 Campfire — Sun Ultra Enterprise 4000 and 5000
 Campfire+ — Sun Ultra Enterprise 4500 and 5500
 Campus — Sun SPARCStation 1
 Campus+ — Sun SPARCStation 1+
 Campus2 — Sun SPARCStation 10
 Campus2+ — Sun SPARCStation 10SX and 10BSX
 Canary — Windows Mobile Smartphone 2002
 Candy — Atari 400
 Canterwood — Intel 875P chipset
 Capone — Apple System Software 7.5
 Captain Rayno — Lunar Linux 1.3.2
 Carl Sagan — Apple Power Macintosh 7100/66
 Carmel — Intel i840 chipset
 Carmel — Sun StorEdge D2 Array
 Carrera — CPU card in Sun—3/140, 3/150, 3/160, 3/180
 Cartman — Red Hat Linux 6.1
 Casanova — Sun SPARCEngine CP1400
 Cascade0Mb — Ethernet and PCI Bus
 Cezanne — Ryzen 5000 APUs
 Cheetah — Apple Mac OS X 10.0
 Cheetah — Sun UltraSPARC III
 Cheetah+ — Sun UltraSPARC III Cu
 Cheeze Whiz — AppleScript
 Chelan — Windows Embedded Compact 7
 Chels — Apple IIc
 Cherrystone — Sun SunFire V440/V480
 Chicago — Microsoft Windows 95
 Chilliwack  — XMetaL 3.1
 Chimera — Apple Power Macintosh 5400
 Chimera — Sun PCi II
 Chinook — Apple Workgroup Server 95
 Chivano — Intel processors
 Chrichton — Sun SPARCEngine Ultra AXmp
 Chrysalis Client — Sun skinny Solaris OS for Intel-based NC
 Cinnamon — Apple Macintosh PowerBook Duo 210/230
 Classic — Apple Macintosh PowerBook 100
 ClawHammer — AMD Athlon 64 S754 130 nm processor
 ClickOnce — Microsoft technology to speed application deployment in Longhorn
 Cloud — Trustix Secure Linux 2.0
 Clovertown — Intel Xeon 5300 series processors
 Cobalt — Palm OS 6
 Cobalt — Windows 11
 Cobra — Apple Macintosh IIcx
 Cobra — Sun 4100, 4/110, 4/150
 Cobra II — Apple Macintosh IIci
 Cocoa — Apple Mac OS X API
 Cold Fusion — Apple Power Macintosh 8100/80
 Colfax — Ryzen Threadripper
 Colgate — Red Hat Linux 4.0
 Colleen — Atari 800
 Colorado — Sun 150 MHz HyperSPARC HS11
 Colorado II — Sun 125 MHz HyperSPARC HS21
 Colorado III — Sun 150 MHz HyperSPARC SM151
 Colossus — SunSwift SBus
 Colt 45 — Apple Macintosh PowerBook 145
 Columbia — Sun 4-Disk 1.3GB IPI Elite disk tray
 Columbus — SiS 640
 Colusa — Intel i860
 Combo — Sun SPARCStorage MultiPack and MultiPack 2
 Comet — Apple Macintosh PowerBook 2400c
 Comet — Microsoft Proxy Server 3.0
 Companion — Apple Macintosh PowerBook Duo 2300c
 Condor — Sun 900 MB SMD disk drive
 Condor1 — G450
 Condor2 — G800
 Conroe — Intel desktop processor based on Merom
 Constantine — Fedora 12 Linux
 Converse — Apple Macintosh PowerBook 180
 Cooker — Mandrake Linux current unstable
 Copenhagen — SOT Linux 2002
 Copland — Apple Mac OS Rewrite (cancelled)
 Coppermine — Intel Pentium 3 180 nm processor
 Copperriver — Intel chipsets based on Grantsdale/Alderwood models
 Cornbread — Sun Netra NFS server
 Corona — Microsoft Windows Media Player 9
 Corona — Sun 19" monitor
 Cortet — Vulcan elite CPU
 Cortland — Apple IIGS
 Corvette — AMD Mobile Athlon 4
 Covington — Intel Celeron without L2 cache
 Coyote — Sun Netra st D130
 Crane — Sun CG9
 Crescendo — Sun second DOE product
 Crescendo DC-440 — HP-9000 A400-44 / rp2400
 Crescendo DC-W2 — HP-9000 A440-6X / rp2430
 Crescendo 440 — HP-9000 A500-44 / rp2450
 Crescendo 550 — HP-9000 A500-5X / rp2450
 Crescendo 650 W2 — HP-9000 A500-6X / rp2470 
 Crescendo 750 W2 — HP-9000 A500-7X / rp2470
 Crestine — Intel motherboard system logic
 Crestline — Intel GM965 chipset
 Crusader — Apple Macintosh LC/Performa/Quadra 63X/640/Power Macintosh/Macintosh Performa 62XX/63XX
 Crusoe — Transmeta processor
 Crypto — Sun encryption card
 Crystal — Sun dual channel FC PCI card
 Cuba — Sun Netra S220
 Cupcake — Android 1.5
 Curley — Sun LX/Classic I/O board
 Cyclone — Tandem NonStop RISC (Later HP NonStop)
 Cyclone — Apple Macintosh Quadra 840av
 Cyclone — Sun 19" monitor
 Cyclone — Sun Solstice Corporate Client

D

 Dagwood — Sun
 Daktari — Sun SunFire V880
 Dapper Drake — Ubuntu 6.06 LTS
 Dark Matter — Adobe Photoshop CS
 Dart LC — Apple Macintosh PowerBook 165
 Dartanian — Apple Macintosh PowerBook 180
 Darth Vader — College Linux 2.3
 Darwin — Apple Macintosh Quadra 900
 Darwin — Low-Level Unix layer of Apple Mac OS X
 Darwin — Sun PCI-based Ultra workstations
 Daybreak — Linux Multi-Disk Howto 0.17
 Dayton — Yellow Dog Linux 2.3
 Daytona — Microsoft Windows NT 3.51
 DBLite — Apple Macintosh PowerBook Duo 210/230
 Decaf — Sun 14" monitor
 Deepcove — XMetaL Author 4.0
 Deepmind — Respond.com
 Deerfield — Intel processors due 2003
 dejaVu — Sun PC file viewer
 Delorean — Sun 72" StorEdge Expansion Cabinet
 Derringer — Apple Macintosh PowerBook 100
 Deschutes — Intel Pentium 2
 Detroit — Microsoft Windows 95's cancelled successor
 Deuterium — Sun Ultra 60
 Devel — Arch Linux 0.4
 Diamond — Sun cPCI FC dual port adapter
 Diana — Apple IIe
 Diesel — Adobe Flash CS4
 Dilbert — Sun SCSI2 RAID5 Storage, StorEdge A1000, StorEdge D1000
 Dinnerbox — Sun 5" Full Height Lunchbox
 Dirty Bird — Lunar Linux 1.0
 Discovery — Sun 1.3Gb SCSI disk
 Discus — Sun ???
 Dixon — Intel Mobile Pentium 2
 Dockyard — Ark Linux 1.0
 Dollhouse Simulator — The Sims
 Dolphin — Mandrake Linux 9.0
 Dolphin — Nintendo GameCube
 Donut — Android 1.6
 Dothan — Intel Pentium M 700-series 90 nm processor
 Dove — Apple IIx
 Dover — Sun next generation JavaStation
 Dobra Voda — KDE 3.2 Beta 2 ("dobra voda" is Czech for "good water")
 DR1 — Apple Rhapsody developer release 1
 DR2 — Apple Rhapsody developer release 2
 Dragon — Arch Linux 0.4
 Dragon — Sun SPARCServer 2000
 Dragon+ — Sun SPARCCenter 2000E
 DragonHawk U+ 240 — HP-9000 K380/K580
 Dublin — Sun Ultra Enterprise E150
 Duo — an intel CPU core specification
 Duracell — Sun PDB 1.2 on Ultra Enterprise 2
 Duraflame — Sun Ultra Enterprise 3000
 Duraflame+ — Sun Ultra Enterprise 3500
 Durango — Xbox One
 Dyne:trax — dyne:bolic Linux 1.2 and 1.3

E

 Eagle — Apple Hard Disk 400SC
 Eagle — Sun UltraSPARC IIep
 Eagle Ridge — XMetaL Author 4.0 SP4
 East Fork — Intel digital home PC platform
 Echo Lake — XMAX (XMetaL for ActiveX) 4.0
 Eclair — Android 2.0/2.1
 Eclipse — Apple Macintosh Quadra 900
 Edgy Eft — Ubuntu
 Edison — C++ Builder for MobileSet
 Egret — Sun SBus frame buffer
 Eierspass — grml Linux 0.4
 Eiger —
 Eight Ball — Macromedia Flash 8
 Einstein — Sun Ultra 5 360/440, Ultra 10 440/480
 ELB — Apple Macintosh Quadra 605
 Electron — Sun Ultra 1 Model 170E
 Elf — Apple IIc
 Elite I — Seagate ST41600N
 Elixir — Apple Macintosh Performa 6300–6360
 Elmer — Apple Keyboard II
 Elsie — Apple Macintosh LC
 Elsie — Sun SPARCPrinter EC
 Elsie III — Apple Macintosh LC III
 Emerald — Microsoft Systems Management Server
 Emerald — Sun cPCI Dual Differential Ultra SCSI
 Emerald Bay — Intel EB440BX
 Emily — TinySofa Enterprise Linux 1.0-U2
 Emma — AMD processor for mobile devices
 Enchilada — Sun UltraSPARC IIIi
 Encompass — Sun Enterprise Manager
 Endever —
 Energizer — Sun SPARCServer 1000PDB, SPARCCenter 2000PDB
 Enigma — Red Hat Linux 7.2
 Envici — Art
 Epic — Apple Macintosh PowerBook 1400c
 Equinox — XMetaL Author, XMetaL Developer, and XMAX (XMetaL for ActiveX) 4.6 Service Pack 1
 Erickson — Apple Macintosh IIsi
 Escher — Apple Macintosh PowerBook Duo 270c
 Espresso — Sun JavaStation JE
 Esprit — Apple Macintosh Portable
 Esprit — Turbolinux 7.0S
 Esther — VIA C7
 Eszter — UHU-Linux Live 2.2
 ET — Apple IIc
 Etch — Debian GNU/Linux 4.0
 Europa — Microsoft Visual Foxpro 9.0
 Eveready — Sun E1000 dual AC power grid option
 Everest — Sun GEM FC-AL PCI card
 Everest — https://web.archive.org/web/20070928022536/http://liveeverest.vulcan.com/
 Evo 200 — Apple Macintosh Quadra 700
 Excalibur — Apple Power Macintosh LC 5400
 Excalibur — Sun Multiprocessor UltraSPARC III
 Ezra — Cyrix C3 processor

F

 F-16 — Apple Macintosh IIfx
 F-19 — Apple Macintosh IIfx
 Fafnir — Apple Macintosh SE/30
 Fairbanks — FB820
 Falcon — Microsoft Message Transaction Service
 Fanwood — Intel Itanium 2 1.6 GHz processor
 Fanwood LV — Intel low voltage Itanium 2 1.3 GHz processor
 Fast Eddy — Adobe Photoshop 2.0
 Fast Eddy — Apple built-in CD-ROM drive
 Fat Mac — Apple Macintosh 512k
 Fat Timba — Seagate ST410800WD
 Feint — EnGarde Secure Linux 1.3.0
 Feisty Dunnart — Linux Kernel 2.6.2
 Feisty Fawn — Ubuntu 7.04
 Fernie — XMetaL Developer 4.0
 Ferrari — Sun 3/F
 Festen — Mandrake Linux 5.3
 Fester — RIAA project to announce downloads at RIAA servers
 FFB — Sun Creator
 FFB2 — Sun Creator Series 2
 FFB2+ — Sun Creator Series 3
 Fiji — FJ440ZX
 Finestra — EnGarde Secure Linux 1.0.1
 Fire — Aurox Linux 9.1
 Fireball — Google Allo
 Firefly — Arch Linux 0.3
 Firestorm — Blue Linux 1.0
 Firetruck — Sun UltraSPARC
 Fisher — Red Hat Linux 7.0.90 (reference to Carrie Fisher)
 Five Star — Mandrake Linux 9.2
 Flagship — Apple Power Macintosh 8100/110
 Flamingo — Sun VidIO
 Flapjack — Sun Netra t1 Model 105
 Flare — Source Mage GNU/Linux 0.7
 Flipflop — Sun 3.5" floppy drive
 Flyweight — Sun Netra t1 Model 100
 Foster — Intel Xeon 180 nm processor (Pentium 4-based)
 Foster Farms — Apple Macintosh LC II
 Four Square — Apple Macintosh IIfx
 Fred — Apple Two-Page Monochrome Monitor
 Freeport — Apple Macintosh SE
 Freestyle — Microsoft Windows XP Media Center Edition
 Freeze — RIAA project to remotely hang computers searching for MP3 files
 Freon — Microsoft Xbox
 Freshchoice — SunSwift PCI
 Freshchoice Lite — SunFastEthernet PCI
 Fridge — Apple Macintosh Quadra 800
 Frogger — Apple Freedom Network
 FroYo — Android 2.2
 Fuji — Yellow Dog Linux 2.1
 Full Monty — Sun Directory Services
 Fullmoon — Sun single IP address cluster
 Fusion — Microsoft Windows XP add-ons
 Fusion — Sun UltraSPARC family
 Future — Magic Linux 1.1

G

 Gaga — Chinese Linux Extension 1.1
 Galactica — Sun StorEdge L20, L40, L60
 Galaxy — Sun SPARCServer 600MP, 630MP, 670MP, 690MP
 Galiano — XMAX (XMetaL for ActiveX) 4.0 Service Pack 4
 Galibaldi — D850GB
 Galileo — Microsoft Windows CE 3.0, Handheld PC 2000
 Galileo — Microsoft Enterprise Studio for .NET
 Galileo — Sun Ultra 10 cancelled replacement
 Gallatin — Intel Xeon MP or Pentium 4 Extreme Edition w/ 2MB L3 cache
 Garfield — Seagate ST1480N
 Gaston 2 — Intel wireless Ethernet technology
 Gemini — Sun JavaOS 1.2
 Gemini — Sun UltraSPARC dual processor CPU due in 2004
 Gemini-64 — SCO project to adapt UnixWare to 64-bit processors
 General Protection Fault — Lunar Linux 1.4.0
 Genesis — Frugalware Linux 0.1
 Genesis — Sun GE Medical special product
 Genie — Sun browser-based tool for Solaris
 Gershwin — Apple Mac OS 9
 Geyserville — SpeedStep
 Gideon — KDevelop 3.0
 Gingerbread — Android 2.3
 Glenwood — Intel i955X chipset
 Gobi — Cyrix processor
 Gobi — IBM 750GX processor
 Goddard — Fedora 13 Linux
 Godzilla — Sun Ultra 10 cancelled replacement
 Golden Gate — Apple IIx
 Goldfish — Apple 16" Color Monitor
 Golem — Sun JavaPC Engine RC2
 Gossamer — Apple Power Macintosh G3
 Granite Bay — Intel E7205 chipset
 Grantsdale — Intel i915P and i915G chipsets
 Green Jade — Apple Macintosh SE/30
 Greencreek — Intel 5000X chipset
 Greenwich — Microsoft Office 2003 real-time collaboration
 Grendelsbane — RPM Live Linux CD 0.9
 Grimoire — Sorcerer Linux current unstable
 Grimoire — Source Mage GNU/Linux current
 Grizzly — Sun SS20 with hyperSPARC
 Grover — Sun Next generation Darwin 10
 Gryphon — Microsoft Windows CE 2.01, Palm PC 1.0
 Guava — Sun PGX64
 Guinness — Apple Macintosh Portable
 Guinness — Red Hat Linux 7.0 (reference to Alec Guinness)
 Guinness — Silicon Graphics Indy Workstation
 Gumbi — Sun QuadFastEthernet PCI
 Gumby — Apple IIGS
 Gutsy Gibbon — Ubuntu 7.10
 Gypsy — Sun SPARCStation Voyager

H

 Haarlem — MCNLive CD Linux released February 13, 2005
 Hades — Annvix Linux 1.0
 Hadjaha — Gimp 1.2
 Hailstorm — Blue Linux 2.0
 HailStorm — Microsoft .Net initiative
 Hakone — OpenOffice.org 1.1.2
 Halfdome — Sun SPARCPrinter E
 Half—Dome — Apple OneScanner
 Halibut — CVS 1.10
 Halloween — Red Hat Linux 0.9
 Halo — Sun SunRay 150
 Hamlet — Sun SPARCclassic, SPARCclassic X
 Hamm — Debian GNU/Linux 2.0
 Hammer — AMD K8 architecture
 Hammerhead — Sun HPC 2.0
 Happy Meal — Sun FEPS chip
 Hardy Heron — Ubuntu 8.04 LTS
 Harpertown — Intel Xeon 5400 series processors
 Hastings — PC1066 RDRAM
 Hawaii — Sun EXB-8500
 Hawk II — Sun GT Graphics Tower
 Hawk — Sun EXB-8500
 Heckel — Seagate ST3610N
 Hedwig — Red Hat Linux 6.0
 Heidelberg — Fedora Core Linux 3
 Hekk — UHU-Linux 1.2-rc1
 Helios — Mandrake Linux 6.1
 Helium — Mandrake Linux 7.1
 Hercules — Sun 24" color HDTV monitor
 Herkules — UHU-Linux 1.2-beta0
 Hermes — Microsoft Windows CE 2.11 for Webphones
 Hoary Hedgehog — Ubuntu 5.04
 Hobbes — Sun SPARCStation IPX
 Hobo — Sun 4800b keyboard/mouse for Gypsy
 Hokusai — Apple Macintosh PowerBook 180c
 Homer — Arch Linux 0.1
 Honeycomb — Android 3.0/3.1/3.2
 Hook 33 — Apple Macintosh LC 550
 Hook — Apple Macintosh Performa 550
 Hooper — Apple Macintosh PowerBook 3400c
 Horizon — Trustix Secure Linux 2.1
 Hornet — Sun UltraSPARC I
 HotJava — Sun web browser written in Java
 Houdini — Adobe Acrobat
 Hulk Hogan — Apple A/UX 3.0
 Hummingbird — Sun StorEdge L1000
 Hurricane — Blue Linux 1.0 RC2
 Hurricane — Red Hat Linux 5.0
 Hurricane — Sun 21" monitor
 Hustenstopper — grml Linux 0.3
 Hydra — Adobe AIF Toolkit - https://web.archive.org/web/20071127101741/http://labs.adobe.com/wiki/index.php/AIF_Toolkit#Windows
 Hydra — Microsoft Windows NT 4.0 Terminal Server Edition
 Hydra — Sun 3/80
 Hydra96 — HP-9000 G70/I70/H70 - 887/897
 Hyperbolic — Apple Power Macintosh with an Exponential x704 microprocessor

I

 Ibis — Sun CG8
 ICE-T — Sun Java front-end development tool client/server C/C++ apps
 Ice Cream — SunOS 4.1.1-B
 Ice Cream Sandwich — Android 4.0
 Iceberg — BLAG Linux 30000
 ICSN.com — (I Can't Say Nothing) About.com
 Igen — Uhu Linux 2.0
 IIb — Apple IIc (book-sized)
 IIp — Apple IIc (portable)
 Ikki — Apple Macintosh II
 Indigo — Microsoft .NET communication technologies
 Indium — Lunar Linux 1.5.0
 Infinite Improbability Drive — TransGaming WineX 3.3
 Instatower — Apple Macintosh Performa 6400
 Interface Manager — Windows 1.0
 Intrepid Ibex — Ubuntu 8.10
 Irongate — AMD-751 chipset
 Ironsides — Sun L700 tape system
 Irwindale — Intel Xeon 90 nm processor w/ 2MB L2 cache
 Italy — AMD Opteron 200-series 90 nm dual-core processor
 Itanium — Intel IA-64 processor
 Ivory — Sun dual channel FC-AL SBus card
 Ivy — Sun 17" entry level

J

 Jackson — Hyper-Threading
 Jackson Pollock — Apple QuickDraw 32-bit
 Jade 180 U — HP-9000 T540/T600 - 893
 Jaguar — Apple Mac OS X v10.2
 Jaguar — Sun UltraSPARC IV
 Jaguar — Sun VME/SMD-4 disk controller
 Jalapeño — Sun ASIC for Nachos/SunVideo
 Janus — Microsoft Windows 3.1
 Jasmine — Sun 17" premium monitor
 Jason — Apple IIc
 Jasper — Sun StorEdge PCI Dual Ultra3 SCSI Adapter
 Jaunty Jackalope — Ubuntu 9.04
 Javelin — Sun 2 CPU PCI midrange workgroup server
 Jayhawk — Intel Xeon processor based on Tejas; project cancelled
 Jeckle — Sun 3.5" 535 MB disk
 Jedi — College Linux 2.1
 Jedi — Cyrix processor
 JeDI — Apple Macintosh PowerBook 150 ("Just Did It")
 Jedy — SiS 5581/5582
 Jelly Bean — Android 4.1
 Jeeves — Sun Java-powered Internet Server software (Java Web Server)
 Jessie — Debian GNU/Linux 8.0
 Jet — Sun VX, MVX
 Jiro — Sun Project StoreX
 John — Conner CFP1080E
 John — IBM DPES-31080
 Jonah — Intel 3rd generation Pentium M core (also known as Yonah)
 Joshua — Cyrix processors
 JOT — JBA (Software Ltd) Open Toolcase
 Juhhu! — UHU Linux 1.0
 Jumanji — Sun StorEdge A7000
 Juneau — Intel JN440BX
 Junior — Alt Linux 1.1
 Junior — Alt Linux 2.0
 Jupiter — Microsoft Windows CE 2.11, Handheld PC Professional (3.0)
 Jupiter — Microsoft XML-based web services products
 Jupiter — SunOS 5.0 (Solaris 2.0)
 
 Janak — ja625

K

 K2 — Adobe Indesign
 Kaede — Momonga Linux 1
 Kahlua — Sun 17" entry level monitor
 Kamion — UHU Linux 1.1
 Kanga — Apple Macintosh PowerBook 3500
 Kangaroo — Hewlett-Packard HP-75C
 Kansas — Apple Power Macintosh 8600 and 9600
 Karatu — Turbolinux 3.0
 Karelia — ASP Linux 10
 Karmic Koala — GNU\Linux Ubuntu 9.10
 Katana — Sega Dreamcast
 Katmai — Intel Pentium 3 250 nm processor
 Kauai — KU440EX
 Kauai — Sun KJava VM
 Kelowna — XMetaL Author 4.0 Service Pack 1
 Ketchup — UHU Linux 1.2-beta2
 Keystone — HP-9000 rp7410
 Khepri — IBM two-way processors
 Kitkat — Android 4.4
 Kkachi — WOWLinux 7.0
 Klamath — Intel Pentium 2 350 nm processor
 Klingon — Seagate ST12400N
 Kodiak — Microsoft Exchange Server
 Kodiak — Sun SPARCStation 20
 KolibriOS — Kolibri Operating System
 Kollege — KDE 3.3 Beta 2
 Kona — Seagate ST5660N
 Kong — Apple Two-Page Monochrome Monitor
 Kootenay — OEone HomeBase Linux 1.7
 Kopernicus — KDE 2.0
 Krakatoa — Sun GUI/deskset tools for JavaStation, HotJava Views
 Krans — DEC TOPS-20
 Krum — Tilix Linux 0.5
 Krups — Sun 2nd Generation JavaStation
 Kryptonite — AMD K5, K6 processors
 Kyoto — Turbolinux 1.0
 Kyrene — Intel processors

L

 Lady Kenmore — Apple Macintosh Performa 200
 Ladner — XMetaL Developer 4.0 Service Pack 1
 LaGrande — Intel's security features in new processors
 Laguna — Apple Macintosh Portable
 Lakeport — Intel i945 chipset
 Landshark — HP 9000 PA-RISC 8600 processor PCX-W+
 LAW — Apple Power Macintosh 7100/66 ("Lawyers Are Wimps")
 Laughlin — Fedora Linux 14
 LCA — (Low Cost Apple) Apple IIe
 LD50 — Apple Macintosh TV
 Leadville — Sun StorEdge network foundation software
 Leary — Apple Macintosh PowerBook 140
 Legend — SCO OpenServer 6
 Lego — Sun CG6
 LegoA — Sun GX CG6
 Leeloo — Mandrake Linux 5.2
 Lenny — Debian GNU/Linux 5.0
 Leo — Sun ZX
 Leo II — Sun ZX+
 Leonidas — Fedora Linux 11
 Leopard — Apple Mac OS X 10.5
 Liberation — White Box Enterprise Linux 3.0
 Liberty — Sql Server 2000 (64 Bit)
 Lightweight — Sun NEBS-compliant Ultra server
 Lilac — Sun 17" premium color monitor
 Limbo — Red Hat Linux 7.3.29 / 7.3.93 / 7.3.94
 Lindenhurst — Intel Chipset
 Liquid Sky — Adobe Photoshop 7.0
 Lisa — Apple Lisa
 Little Big Mac — Apple Macintosh II
 Littleneck — Sun SunFire 280R
 Logo — Apple Color StyleWriter Pro
 Lokar —
 Lollie — Apple IIc
 Lollipop — Android 5.1
 Lonestar — Windows XP Tablet PC 2005
 Longhorn — Windows Vista
 Longhorn Server — Windows Server 2008
 Lorax — Red Hat Linux 6.1 Beta
 Lorraine — Amiga
 Lovelock — Fedora Linux 15
 Love Shack — Apple Macintosh Portable (backlit)
 Lucid Lynx — Ubuntu 10.04
 Lumumba — dyne:bolic Linux 1.4
 Luna — Sun JavaOS 1.1
 Lunchbox — Sun Desktop Disk Pack
 Lutra sumatrana — TA-Linux 0.2.0-rc1
 Luzon — Sun TDMA IWF for Lucent Technologies
 Lyra — K-DEMar Linux 2.2

M

 M2 — Apple Macintosh PowerBook 5300
 M64 — Sun PGX PCI 8-bit color
 Mac ± — Apple Macintosh SE
 Macallan — Microsoft Windows CE 5.0
 Maccabbee — StartCom Linux 3.0.1-AS
 Mach5 — PowerPC 604e
 Macintosh — Apple Macintosh
 Macintosh IIce — Apple Macintosh Quadra 700
 Macintosh IIex — Apple Macintosh Quadra 900
 Macintosh IIvm — Apple Macintosh Performa 600
 Macintosh IIxi — Apple Macintosh IIfx
 MACIO — Sun Ethernet, Parallel and SCSI ASIC chip
 Mad Hatter — Sun Java Desktop
 Madison — IBM x450 server
 Madison — Intel Itanium 2 130 nm processor w/ up to 6MB L3 cache
 Madison 9M — Intel Itanium 2 130 nm processor w/ 9MB L3 cache
 Mafalda — Sun SunConnect OSI 8.0
 Magneto — Sun 66/33 MHz PCI bus card
 Magnolia — AMD Athlon
 Magnum — Sun Datacenter Switch 3456
 Mai Tai — Apple 12" RGB Monitor
 Main Street — Apple Macintosh PowerBook G3/350-400
 Maipo — Red Hat Enterprise Linux 7
 Makalu — Rocks Cluster Linux 3.3.0
 Mako — Sun HPC ClusterTools 3.0
 Makrolab — Dyne:bolic GNU/Linux 1.x
 Malibu — Apple Macintosh Portable
 Mamba — Sun 16-port FC-AL switch
 Mammoth — Sun EXB-8900
 Manchester — AMD Athlon 64 X2 dual core processor w/ 2*512KB L2 cache
 Mango — Sun PGX32
 Mango — Windows Phone 7.5
 Manhattan — Red Hat Linux 5.1
 Manifest — White Box Enterprise Linux 4
 Manila — AMD Sempron 90 nm processor (Socket AM2 w/ DDR2-667)
 Manitoba —
 Mantaray — Sun-4/370 deskside, 12-slot pedestal system
 Marathon — Intel 2700G graphics accelerator
 Marblehead — XMAX (XMetaL for ActiveX) 4.0 Service Pack 1
 Mark Twain — Apple IIGS
 Marcato W+ — HP-9000 L3000-5X
 Mars — SunOS 5.1 (Solaris 2.1)
 Mars — Sega 32X
 Marshmallow — Android 6.0
 Mascarpone — UHU-Linux 1.2-rc3
 Master — Alt Linux 2.0
 Matterhorn — Rocks Cluster Linux 3.1.0
 Matterhorn — Sun ACL 4/52, ETL 4/1000
 Matterhorn2 — Sun ACL 4/100, ETL 4/1800, StorEdge L1800
 Matterhorn W2 750 — HP-9000 rp7410
 Matthew — Cyrix processor
 Maui — Apple Macintosh SE
 Maui — MU440EX
 Maui — Sun EXB-8505
 MauiXL — Sun EXB-8505XL
 Maverick Meerkat — Ubuntu 10.10
 Maxcat — Sun 104-way server
 McKinley — Intel Itanium 2
 Meerkat — Sun Serengeti System Controller board
 Memphis — Microsoft Windows 98
 Menagine — Apple Workgroup Server 95
 Mending — Source Mage GNU/Linux 0.8
 Mendocino — Intel Celeron 250 nm processor with L2 cache
 Mendocino — AMD SoC for entry level with Zen 2 and RDNA2 architectures on TSMC 6 nm process
 Merced — Intel Itanium processor
 Mercury — Intel 430MX
 Mercury — Microsoft Windows CE 2.0, Handheld PC 2.0
 Mercury — Sega Game Gear
 Mercury — Sun encryption card
 Merl —
 Merlin — Adobe Photoshop 2.5 for Mac
 Merlin — IBM OS/2 Warp 4.0
 Merlin — Hewlett-Packard HP-75D
 Merlin — Microsoft Windows CE 3.0, Pocket PC 2002
 Merlin — Sun 18.1" flat panel
 Merom — Intel Core 2 Duo Mobile processor
 Metro — Sun Visual Workshop 3.0
 Midas — Apple Trackpad 1.0
 Midnight Run — Apple Macintosh SE
 Midway — Microsoft Xbox
 Mighty Cat — Apple Macintosh PowerBook 2400c
 Mikey — Hitachi mini-Microdrive
 Milan — 3rd generation Epyc
 Millennium — Microsoft Windows ME
 Millennium — Sun UltraSPARC V
 Millington — Intel dual—core two-way Itanium 2 processor due mid-2005
 Milwaukee — Apple Macintosh II
 Minnow — Sun Storedge 3310 disk array
 Mira — Microsoft Windows CE for Smart Displays (cancelled 12/2003)
 Mishteh — StartCom Linux 3.0.3-ML
 Mistral —
 Mobile Triton — Intel 430MX
 Mohawk 160 — HP-9000 K450
 Mohawk 180 — HP-9000 K460 - 889
 Mojave — Cyrix processor
 Monad — Microsoft Shell
 Monet — Apple Macintosh PowerBook 165c
 Montana — Apple Macintosh Classic II
 Montana — Apple Power Macintosh 8600 and 9600
 Montara GML — Intel processors
 Monte Carlo — Sun Netra ct 800
 Montecito — Intel IA-64 processors
 Montera — Intel processors
 Monterey — SCO/IBM/Sequent Unix
 Montvale — Intel successor to Montecito processors due 2007
 Monza — Turbolinux 7W
 Mooch — Tao Linux 1.0-U3
 Moonbase — Lunar Linux current
 Moonshine — Sun backplane bus for 12 and 16 slot chassis, also Fedora 7 Linux
 Moosehead — Silicon Graphics O2 Workstation
 Morgan — AMD Duron processor
 Morgan — Sun 1-way UltraSPARC IIIi
 Moriarty — Sun System Handbook
 Moses — Apple Mac OS X Server-Based Mac
 Mother's Day — Red Hat Linux 1.0
 Mother's Day .1 — Red Hat Linux 1.1
 Mount Prospect — Intel MP440BX
 Mousex — Lunar Linux 1.3
 Moxie — Adobe Flex 3.0
 Mozilla — Netscape Navigator (since spun off as its own name and browser)
 Mr. Coffee — Sun 1st generation JavaStation 1
 Mr. T — Apple Macintosh Plus
 Mriya — ASP Linux 7.1
 Mucho Grande — MG8
 Mulligan — Apple Macintosh Portable (backlit)
 Mustang — AMD processor
 Mustang — Red Hat Linux 4.9 / 4.9.1 / 4.96
 Mustang — Sun Java 2 Standard Edition 6.0 (due 2006)

N

 N10 — Intel i860 processor
 N11 — Intel i860XP processor
 Nachos — SunVideo
 Nahant — Red Hat Enterprise Linux 3.94
 Nano — Lunar Linux 1.1.2
 Napa — Intel Centrino 3rd-generation
 Naples — 1st generation Epyc
 Nashville — Microsoft Windows 96 (discontinued)
 Natoma — Intel 440FX
 Natty Narwhal — Ubuntu 11.04
 Nautilus — Apple Macintosh PowerBook 2400c
 Navigator — IBM 3174
 Nehalem — Intel's 45 nm Technology Process
 Nehemiah — Cyrix C4 processor
 Nell — Sun SBus PCMCIA adapter
 Neptune — Intel 430NX
 Neptune — Microsoft Windows 2000 Home Edition (cancelled)
 Neptune — Sun SPARCEngine EC
 Neutron — Sun Ultra 1
 Nevada — Apple Power Macintosh 9500/180-200
 Nevada —  development releases of Solaris
 Newcastle — AMD Athlon 64 processor with 512KB L2 cache
 Newton — Progeny Linux 1.0
 Niagara — Sun UltraSPARC 8-processor CPU, successor to Gemini, due in 2005
 Niagra — Sun Tape Backup Tray
 Nighthawk — Sun TurboSPARC-based SS5
 Ninevah — Intel Ethernet chip
 Nitro — Apple Power Macintosh 8500/120
 Nitro — Nintendo DS
 Nocona — Intel 64-bit Xeon processors
 Nodewarrior — Sun SPARCstation ELC
 NoDo — "Copy&Paste" update for Windows Phone 7
 Noodle — ROOT GNU/Linux 1.3
 Nordica — Sun SPARCEngine CP1500
 North — AppleTalk Internet Router
 Northbridge — AMD-762
 Northwood — Intel Pentium 4 130 nm processor
 Nougat — Android 7.0/7.1
 Nova — Arch Linux 0.5
 Nova96 — HP-9000 G60/H60/I60
 NT 5.0 - Microsoft Windows 2000
 NuKernel — Apple kernel
 NV35 — NVidia GeForce FX 5900
 NV36 — NVidia GeForce FX 5700
 NV38 — NVidia GeForce FX 5950
 NX — Nintendo Switch

O

 Oak — Sun Java
 OberoN — Linux Smart Card Howto 1.0.4
 Obi Wan — CollegeLinux 2.5
 Oceanic — Apple Macintosh IIsi
 Odem — Intel 855PM chipset
 Odin — TinySofa Enterprise Server Linux 2.0
 Odyssey — Microsoft Windows 2000's cancelled successor
 Odyssey — Mandrake Linux 7.2
 Odyssey — SiS 740
 Offcampus — Sun SPARCstation SLC
 Okinawa — Turbolinux 2.0
 Omega — Apple Macintosh PowerBook 190/190c
 Oneiric Ocelot — Ubuntu 11.10
 Ootpa — Red Hat Linux 8.0
 Optimus — Apple Macintosh LC 575
 Orbis — PlayStation 4
 Orbit — Sun SolarNet PC-X terminal software
 Orca — Sun E4000/E5000
 Oreo — Sun Netra j 3.0, Android 8.0/8.1
 Orion — Microsoft Windows CE 2.11, Palm-sized PC 1.1
 Orion — Yellow Dog Linux 4.0
 Orion DT — Intel 450KX
 Orion ST — Intel 450GX
 Orleans — AMD Athlon 64 90 nm processor (Socket AM2 w/ DDR2-667)
 OS04 — grml Linux 0.1
 Oslo — Sun QIC-2.5GB 1/4" Tape
 Osmium — Exchange 5.5
 Osoyoos — XMetaL Author and Developer 4.0 Trial Version
 Osprey — Sun Millennium-based workgroup server
 Othello — Sun cPCI 500 MHz USIIe CPU
 Otter — Sun Ultra 5
 Owens — Sun NetDynamics Release/Rev 5

P

 Pacific — Apple Macintosh IIci
 Pacifica — AMD processor virtualizat ion features
 Palermo — AMD Sempron S754 90 nm processor
 Palladium — Microsoft Next Generation Secure Computing Base (Microsoft Codename Longhorn component)
 Palomino — AMD Athlon XP/MP 180 nm processor
 Panama — Red Hat Enterprise Linux 2.1 ES
 Panda — Sun SS20 with 75 MHz Voyager
 Panther — Apple Mac OS X 10.3
 Panther — Sun SPARCEngine Ultra AXi
 Paramount — SuperSavage
 Paran — WOWLinux 7.1
 Paran—R2 — WOWLinux 7.3 Beta
 Parhelia — G1000
 Paris — AMD Sempron S754 130 nm processor
 Paris — Apple Macintosh II
 Paul — Conner CFP1080S
 PBox — Sun External Expansion Module
 Peanuts — Sun low cost 207 MB disk
 Pegasus — Microsoft Windows CE 1.0
 Pendolino — SmoothWall Linux 2.0 Beta 7
 Penguin — Sun PCi—based SunPC card
 Penryn — Intel Core 2 "Core architecture" 45 nm die shrink with SSE4
 Pensacola — Red Hat Linux AS 2.1 / RHEL 2.1 AS
 Perestroika — Apple A/UX 2.0
 Perigree — Sun SPARCstation 4
 Persistence — TinySofa Enterprise Linux 2.0-pre3
 Peter Pan — Apple Macintosh TV
 Phantasmal — Source Mage GNU/Linux 0.6
 Pharaoh — StartCom Linux 3.0.0-DL
 Phiphi — LinuxTLE 4.1
 Phenom — Family of AMD processors
 Phoebe — Red Hat Linux 8.1
 Phoenix — Apple IIGS
 Phoenix — Apple Power Macintosh LC 5420/5500
 Phoenix — Sun SPARCstation IPC
 Photon — Sun Enterprise Network Array A5000
 Picasso — Red Hat Linux 3.0.3
 Pico — Lunar Linux 1.2
 Pie — Android 9.0
 Piglet — Red Hat Linux 6.1.92
 Piglet — Sun real—time MPEG2 decoder
 Pike's Peak — Apple Macintosh PowerBook 145B
 Piltdown Man — Apple Power Macintosh 6100/60
 Pinball — Apple Macintosh LC
 Pineapple — Sun PCI framebuffer/graphics for U30
 Ping—Pong — Apple OneScanner
 Pinnacle — LSI HyperSPARC chip
 Pinnacle Ridge — Ryzen 2000
 Pinstripe — Red Hat Linux 6.9.5
 Pippin — Apple IIc
 Pipeline HD — Seagate IIc
 Pismo — Apple PowerBook G3 (version with Firewire Ports)
 Pizza — Apple IIc+
 Placer — Intel E7505 chipset
 Plano — Sun 19" monitor
 Platinum — Sun next generation Crichton
 Platte —
 Pliska — Tilix Linux 0.3
 Plumas — Intel E7500 chipset
 Plus — WOWLinux 6.1
 PlusPlus — Apple Macintosh SE
 Pluto — Sun SPARCStorage Array Model 101, 102, 112
 Polaris — Sun3, SPARC, Sun4/E
 Pommes — ROOT GNU/Linux 1.4 Beta
 Pomona — Yellow Dog Linux 2.0
 Pooh — Sun real-time MPEG2 decoder
 Poppy — Sun 17" entry level
 Portland —
 Portola — i752
 Potato — Debian GNU/Linux 2.2
 Potomac — Intel Xeon MP
 Powderhorn — Sun StorEdge L6000
 Power Express — Apple Power Macintosh G3 Pro
 Power Surge — Apple Power Macintosh PCI
 Powerware — Sun SPARCWorks/Accelerator
 Precise Pangolin — Ubuntu 12.04
 Prelude — Sun Solaris/Workshop for Objects
 Prelude W — HP-9000 N4000-36
 Prelude W 440 — HP-9000 N4000-44
 Prelude W+ 550 — HP-9000 N4000-55
 Premise 500 — Apple Macintosh Quadra 900
 Prescott — Intel Pentium 4 500 series, successor to Northwood
 Presler — Intel Pentium 4 6×1 series, successor to Prescott-2M
 Prestonia — Intel Xeon 130 nm processor
 Primus — Apple Macintosh LC 475
 Primus — Apple Macintosh Quadra 605
 Prism — Apple Macintosh LC
 Private Variables — Lunar Linux 1.3.3
 Profusion — Intel processors
 Project Alabama — Avowed (upcoming Obsidian Entertainment RPG)
 Project Atlantis — Nintendo Game Boy Advance
 Project Café — Nintendo Wii U
 Project Chess — IBM PC
 Project Ganges — ShoppingList.com
 Project K — Apple eMate 300
 Project Needlemouse — Sonic The Hedgehog 4 Episode 1
 Project Pipeline — RxCentric.com Inc.
 Project Reality — Nintendo 64
 Project X — The Sims
 Propeller — Apple IIc+
 Proton — Acorn BBC Model B "Beeb" Microcomputer.
 Psyche — Red Hat Linux 8.0
 Psycho+ — Sun UPA to PCI bus bridge
 Puberty — WOWLinux 6.2
 Puffin — Google desktop search application
 Pulsar — Sun Ultra 2
 Puma — Apple Mac OS X 10.1
 Puppy — Name of Linux OS
 Purple — Sun RAID disk storage
 Python — Seagate ST42400ND
 P9 — Power Mac G4 Cube

Q

 Q88 — Apple Mac Mini (headless affordable mac)
 Q97 — Apple FireWire interface for GarageBand
 QED — Sun Quad Ethernet
 Quadra 1000 — Apple Macintosh Quadra 840av
 Quadro — Sun GX+
 Quahog — Sun E420R
 Quantal Quetzal — Ubuntu 12.10
 Quark — Sun Ultra 30
 Quasar — Sun Ultra 80
 Quattro — Windows Home Server
 QuattroXL — Sun QuadFastEthernet SBus Excel
 Queen Cake — Android 10
 Quesnel — XMetaL Author 4.5
 Quicksilver — Aurox Linux 10.1
 Quicksilver — Sun SelectMail

R

 R2	 — Microsoft Windows Server 2003 R2
 Racer — Silicon Graphics Octane
 Radiance — Sun WebCT
 Raffica — Apple Macintosh IIsi
 Raffika — Apple Macintosh IIsi
 Rage6 — ATI Radeon 7200
 Raisin — Apple IIc+
 Rajt! — UHU-Linux 1.2
 Rambo — Apple IIGS
 Rampage —
 Raphsody DC-360 — HP-9000 L1000-36 / rp5400
 Raphsody DC-440 — HP-9000 L1000-44 / rp5400 
 Raphsody 360 — HP-9000 L2000-36 / rp5460
 Raphsody 440 — HP-9000 L2000-44 / rp5450
 Rapier — Microsoft Windows CE 3.0, Pocket PC 2000
 Raptor — Apple operating system
 Raptor — IBM z800
 Raptor — Seagate ST32550N
 Raring Ringtail — Ubuntu 13.04
 Raven — IBM RS/6000 7017-S70
 Raven — Seagate ST3500N
 Raven Ridge — Ryzen APUs
 Rawhide — Red Hat Linux unstable development tree
 RayBan — Apple Macintosh IIsi
 Razor — Sun E220R
 Rebound — Apple Macintosh Performa 5200
 Rebound — Apple Power Macintosh LC 5200
 Redstone — Windows 10 Anniversary Update
 Red Pill — Adobe Photoshop CS3
 Red Velvet Cake — Android 11
 Regatta — IBM p690
 Rembrandt — Red Hat Linux 3.0.4 / 3.95
 Renault — Apple File Exchange
 Reno — Apple Macintosh II
 Replacements — Apple Macintosh PowerBook 140
 Revolution — Nintendo Wii
 Rex — Debian GNU/Linux 1.2
 Rhapsody — Apple Mac OS X Server 1.0 and enterprise OS
 Rialto — Sun StorEdge L280
 Richmond — XMetaL Developer 4.5
 Rincewind — VLC Media Player 2.1
 Ringo — Conner CFP2105E
 Ringo — Seagate ST32430WC
 Rio — TinySofa Classic Server Linux 1.1
 Rio de Janeiro — SOT Linux 2000R3
 Riviera — Apple Macintosh Portable
 Road Warrior — Apple Macintosh PowerBook 170
 Roadracer — Sun graphics card (GXi) for Sun386i
 Roadrunner — Sun386i, RR150, RR250
 Roam — Sun remote mail client
 Rochester — Intel RC440BX
 Rocky — Sun deskside system enclosure package
 Rockchip — Apad Processor chip
 Rome — Yellow Dog Linux 2.2
 Rome — 2nd generation Epyc
 Romeo — Sun SPARCEngine CP1400
 Rosebud — Apple Macintosh PowerBook 100
 Rosebud — Sun 16" mid-range monitor
 Rost — UHU-Linux 1.2-rc2
 Roswell — Red Hat Linux 7.1.90 / 7.1.94
 Round One Inc. — epinions.com Inc.
 Royale — Macromedia Flex 1.0
 Rubicon — Power Mac G4 Cube
 Rudi — KDE 3.2

S

 Sabin — Tilix Linux 1.0-Beta1
 Sabre — Sun MicroSPARC IIep
 Sabrina — Android 12/12.1
 Safari — Sun UltraSPARC III
 Sagres — Ciaxa Magica Linux 8.0
 Sahara — IBM 750FX processor
 Salem — SA820
 Samila — LinuxTLE 5.5
 Samuel — Cyrix processor
 Sandy Bridge — Second Generation Intel Core I processor
 San Diego — AMD Athlon 64/FX S939 90 nm processor
 Santa Fe — Sun telco processor enhancer
 Santa Rosa — Intel Centrino 4th-generation
 Santiago — Red Hat Enterprise Linux 6
 Sapphire — Sun UltraSPARC II
 Sara — Apple III
 Sarge — Debian GNU/Linux 3.1
 Satura — grml Linux 0.2
 Sawtooth — Apple G4 tower
 Scimitar —
 Scorpion — Sun SPARCServer 1000
 Scud — Sun DSBE/S
 Sea Lion — Sun Ultra 10
 Seam — Sun p4bus Greyscale/Mono Frame Buffer
 Seattle — Intel SE440BX
 Seattle2 — Intel SE440BX-2
 Seawolf — Red Hat Linux 7.1
 Seawolf — Sun StorEdge L180
 Serengeti — Sun Enterprise Server family
 Sevar — Tilix Linux 0.4
 Severn — aborted Red Hat Linux 10 (transferred to the Fedora project)
 Shadow — Apple Macintosh Quadra 700
 ShakaZulu — Sun 400M trialngle graphics
 Shame — RIAA project to distribute viruses in MP3 files
 Shark — IBM Enterprise Storage Server (ESS)
 Sharptooth — AMD K6-3 processor
 Shasta — Rocks Cluster Linux 3.2.0
 Shasta — Sun 2-way UltraSPARC IIIi
 Sheffield — Sun Netra ft 1800
 Sheffield Tesla — Sun Netra ft 1800
 Shelton — Intel Banias with no L2 cache (aka Banias-0)
 Sherlock — Apple internet information retrieval application
 Sherlock — Sun Answerbook viewable via HTML
 Sherman — Sun SPARCServer Voyager motherboard
 Sherry — Apple IIc
 Shillelagh — Source Mage GNU/Linux 0.5
 Shiloh — Microsoft SQL Server 2000 (8.0)
 Shiner HE — Apple Network Server 700
 Shiner LE — Apple Network Server 500
 Shitake — Zen Linux 1.1
 Shogun —
 Show & Tell — Apple Macintosh LC 630
 Show & Tell — Apple Macintosh Performa 630
 Show & Tell — Apple Macintosh Quadra 630–638
 Show Biz — Apple Macintosh Quadra 630–638
 Shrike — Red Hat Linux 9.0
 Siberia — ASP Linux 9.2
 Sibyl — Sun Interface Converter
 Sid — Debian GNU/Linux unstable development distribution
 Sidewinder — ATI Radeon2
 Silence — RIAA project to scan computers for MP3 files and delete them
 Silverdale — Intel processor virtualization features
 Silverstone — Turbolinux 8.W
 Sirius — Sun CPU card in Sun-3/260, 3/280
 Sirius — Yellow Dog Linux 3.0
 Sisyphus — ALT Linux
 Skipjack — Red Hat Linux 7.2.91
 Skyhawk — Sun cPCI Gigabit Ethernet MMF
 SLAVIO — Sun external serial port ASIC chip
 SledgeHammer — AMD Athlon 64 FX S940 processor
 Slice — Apple Macintosh Color Classic
 Slink — Debian GNU/Linux 2.1
 Slipstream — Sun 1/2" HP Front Load Tape Drive
 Smithfield — Intel Pentium D dual-core processor
 Snapshot — Sun VideoPix
 Snark — DEC TOPS-20
 Snowball — Microsoft Windows for Workgroups 3.11
 Snow Leopard — Apple Mac OS X 10.6
 Sobeck — IBM four-way processors
 Solano — Intel i815 chipset
 Solano2 — Intel i815E chipset
 Solarnet — Sun PCLAN admin utilities for PC enterprise users
 Solstizio — Linux Netwosix 1.1
 Sonata — Apple Mac OS 9.0
 Sonoma — Intel Centrino 2nd-generation
 Sonoma — Sun StorEdge A3000
 Space Cadet — Apple A/UX 2.0
 Space Monkey — Adobe Photoshop CS2
 Space Mountain — Sun ACL 7/100
 Spam — Sun SX imaging accelerator ASIC on motherboard
 Sparkle — Sun XM-5301B
 Sparkler — Sun JDK 1.1.4
 Spartacus — Apple 20th Anniversary Macintosh
 Speedbump 610 — Apple Macintosh Quadra 610
 Speedbump 650 — Apple Macintosh Quadra 650
 Speedracer — SGI Octane 2
 Speedway — Sun tools for optimized Java apps
 SPIFF — Sun Serial Parallel Controller
 Spike — Apple Macintosh Quadra 700
 Spike — Blag Linux 9001
 Spitfire — AMD Duron
 Spitfire — Sun UltraSPARC I
 Splash Mountain — Sun StorEdge L11000
 Spock — Apple Macintosh IIx
 Sponge — Tao Linux 4
 Sport16 — Sun SWIS, SWIS/S, DWIS, DWIS/S
 Sport20 — Sun UDWIS/S
 Sport8 — Sun SSHA
 Springdale — Intel i865PE chipset
 Spruce Goose — Apple Macintosh PowerBook 540
 Spud — Sun 688 MB drive in expansion pedestal
 Sputnik — uOS — The Micro Operating System 0.81
 Sputnik Bluesky — Sun CP2060
 Sputnik Orion — Sun CP2080
 Spuzzum — XMAX (XMetaL for ActiveX) 4.5
 Squeaky — Apple Macintosh II 32-bit ROMs
 Squeeze — Debian GNU/Linux 6.0
 SR-71 — Apple Macintosh PowerBook 540
 Staccato L2 180 — HP-9000 A180c
 Staccato L2 132 — HP-9000 A132
 Star Trek — Apple Mac OS for x86
 Starbuck — Red Hat Linux 5.9
 Starbucks — Apple Workgroup Server 6150/60, 8150/80, 9150/80
 Starburst — Sun Solaris 2.5
 Starcat — Sun SunFire 15000
 Starfire — Sun Ultra Enterprise 10000
 Starter — Aurox Linux 8.0
 Stealth — Apple Macintosh IIfx
 Steam — Online video game distribution store and gamer network
 Stenz — Fedora Core Linux 4
 Stinger — ATI Radeon2
 Stinger — IBM DB2 8.2
 Stinger — Microsoft Windows CE 3.0 for Smart Phones (Smartphone 2002)
 Stinger — Sun 2.1GB disk card
 Stingrack — datacenter enclosure for Sun-4/390, 4/490
 Stingray — Apple Macintosh IIci
 Stingray — deskside enclosure for Sun-4/330
 Stingrock — Sun 4/370
 Stoned Beaver — Linux kernel 2.6.0-test10
 Stonehenge — Adobe Photoshop CS4
 StoreX — Sun open disk API architecture
 Storm — Aurox Linux 9.4
 Strange Cargo — Adobe Photoshop 5.0 and 5.5
 Stratos — Apple Macintosh IIx
 Stretch — Debian GNU/Linux 9.0
 Suck — RIAA project to DOS sites offering MP3 files
 Sumatra — SU810
 Sumatra — Sun SPARCEngine CP1200
 Summit — Apple Workgroup Server 7250/120, 8550/132
 Summit Ridge — Ryzen 1000
 Sunbox — Sun SPARCCluster 1
 Sunchild — Trustix Secure Linux 2.2
 SunDials — Sun
 SunDragon — Sun next generation JavaStation
 Sunergy — Sun SPARCClassic X
 SunFiler — Sun E220R + 1 -2 A1000 + Solaris 7 (StorEdge N8200)
 Sunfire — Sun Ultra Enterprise 6000
 Sunfire+ — Sun Ultra Enterprise 6500
 Sunflower — Sun 20" premium color
 Sunlight — Sun FDDI board
 SunLink PC — Sun TotalNet Advanced Server software
 Sunrack — Sun 56" data center cabinet
 SunRay — Sun SPARC 4/400 series systems
 SunRay 1 — Syn Network Computer desktop system
 Sunrise — Aurox Linux 9.0
 Sunrise — Sun—4/260, 4/280
 SunScreen — Sun SPF100 hardware/software firewall
 SunSwift — Sun SBus 10/100 Mbit/s Ethernet and Fast/wide SCSI2
 Sun Valley — Windows 11 user interface 
 SuperFetch — Microsoft technology in Windows Vista to speed application launch
 SuperGun —
 Super II — Apple IIe
 Superior — Sun 20" premium greyscale
 Supernami — Sun 66 MHz+ microSPARC II chip
 Susan — OpenLab GNU/Linux 3.2
 Suzuka — Turbolinux 10D
 Swift — Sun microSPARC II
 Swing — Sun Java Foundation Classes
 Sysyphus — Alt Linux 2.?
 Strations — The unbeatable warriors

T

 T-Bird — Red Hat Linux 4.8
 T-Rex — IBM z990 mainframe computer
 Tabasco — Sun Redundant Storage Module
 Tactical Domestic Simulator — The Sims
 Tadpole — Sun 5GB 4 mm
 Taj Mahal — FARA on Steroids Active Measures Analytics
 Talisker — Microsoft Windows CE 4.0
 Talon — Sun SunDials
 Tanglewood — Intel processors due 2006
 Tango — Update for Windows Phone 7.5
 Tanner — Intel Pentium 3 Xeon 250 nm processor
 Tantalus — SOT Linux 2003
 Tanzania — Apple Power Macintosh 4400/7220
 Taroon — Red Hat Enterprise Linux 3
 Tarzan — Sun 2.1 GB Differential SCSI
 Tattle — RIAA project to scan computers and report them as pirates
 Taylor3 — Linux Multi-Disk Howto 0.32i
 Tazmax — Sun Ultra Enterprise 450 (A25)
 Tazmo — Sun Ultra 450
 Teddy — Apple IIc ("Testing Every Day")
 Tehama — Intel i850 chipset
 Tejas — Intel processors due Q2 2005 and now cancelled
 Tempest — Apple Macintosh Quadra 660av
 Tempo — Apple Mac OS 8
 Teragrid — Distributed Terascale Facility
 Terminator — Sun Network Terminal Server
 Tervel — Tilix Linux 0.2
 Tettnang — Fedora Core Linux 2.0
 Texas — hacking movement in a Mexican high school operated by PLhackers
 The Considerable Duck — GNOME 2.0.2 Desktop RC1
 Thor — Sun S493
 Thoroughbred — AMD Athlon XP 130 nm processor
 Thunder Mountain — Sun StorEdge L1000
 Thunderbird — AMD Athlon processor
 Thunderbird — Red Hat Linux 4.8 / 4.8.1 / 4.95
 Tiger — Apple Mac OS X 10.4
 Tiger — Sun Java 2 Standard Edition 5.0
 Tiger Eye —
 Tiger Mountain — Adobe Photoshop 3.0 for Mac
 Tillamook — Intel Mobile Pentium with MMX
 Tikanga — Red Hat Enterprise Linux 5
 Tim — Apple Macintosh PowerBook 170
 Tim LC — Apple Macintosh PowerBook 140
 Tim Lite — Apple Macintosh PowerBook 140
 Timba — Seagate ST43401ND
 Timna — Intel processors
 Tiramisu — Android 13
 TNT — Apple Power Macintosh 7500 ("The New Tesseract")
 TNT 100 — HP-9000 T500
 TNT 120 — HP-9000 T520
 Today is gonna be the day — T2 Linux 2.1.0-beta
 Toddy — Sun 14" monitor
 Tofino — XMetaL Author 4.0 Service Pack 2
 Togo — Sun SPARCStorage UniPack
 Togo Tall — Sun SPARCStorage FlexiPack
 Tonga — Sun Netra ct 400
 Topaz — Microsoft Systems Management Server
 Topcat — Sun microSPARC IIi + 256K cache module for Topdog
 Topdog — Sun Ultra AXe
 Toro — Sun Differential SCSI Expansion Pedestal
 Tornado — MSN Messenger Service
 Toucan — G400
 Trail — XMetaL 4.5 Service Pack 3 (XMetaL Author, Developer, XMAX and Central)
 Trailblazer — Apple Power Macintosh LC 5200
 Traktopel — Mandrake Linux 8.0
 Transformer — Apple Macintosh Performa 5200
 Transformer — Apple Power Macintosh LC 5200
 Threshold — Windows 10
 TRex — Seagate/IBM DFHP-34320 4.2 GB 1.6" 7200 rpm disk
 Tribble — Sun SPARCClassicX Rev 2.0 software
 Trike — Blag Linux 9002
 Trinity — SiS 5597/5598
 Trinity — Power Mac G4 Cube
 Triton — Intel 430FX
 Triton/TX — Intel 430TX
 Triton/VX — Intel 430VX
 Triton2 — Intel 430HX
 Troy — AMD Opteron 200 series processors
 Tsunami — Apple Power Macintosh 9500/120
 Tsunami — Sun microSPARC
 Tualatin — Intel Pentium III 130 nm processor
 Tukwila — Intel processors due 2006 (formerly called Tanglewood)
 Tulip — Sun 15" color monitor
 Tulloch — Intel i855 chipset
 Tulsa — Intel Xeon 7100 series
 Tumwater — Intel processors
 Tuppen — WeFlow application
 TurboGX — Sun single SBus GX card with faster 2D/3D vector
 Turion — AMD cpu name
 Twiggy — Sun X6002A thin Floppy
 Twin Castle — Intel E8500 chipset
 TwinPeaks — Sun Java interface to C/C++ library generator
 Twister — G100

U

 Ucluelet — XMetaL Developer 4.0 Service Pack 2
 Ulysses — Mandrake Linux 7.2
 UltraLight 2W U+/240 — HP-9000 D390/R390 
 UltraPenguin — Sun port of Linux 2.2 kernel for UltraSPARC
 Underdog — Sun PCI ATM
 Underground — WOWLinux 6.2
 Union Bay — XMetaL 4.6 (XMetaL Author, Developer and XMAX)
 Unisun — Sun Campus/SPARCstation 1
 Update 1 — Lycoris Desktop/LX Build 44
 Update 2 — Lycoris Desktop/LX Build 46
 Update 3 — Lycoris Desktop/LX Build 142
 Ural — ASP Linux 9
 Uzi — Apple Macintosh II

V

 Vail — Apple Macintosh LC III
 Valandraud — Vine Linux 3.0
 Valhalla — Red Hat Linux 7.3
 Valkyrie — SunOS 4.1.3 (Solaris 1.1 Rev B)
 Vanadium — Windows 10 version 1909
 Vancouver — VC820
 Vanderbilt — Red Hat Linux 4.1
 Vanderpool — Intel Virtualization Technology
 Vega — Arch Linux 0.2
 Vega — Sun StarOffice 5.1
 Venice— AMD Athlon 64 90 nm processor w/ 512KB L2 cache
 Vegas — Sun Aurora Technology 7-slot PCI Expander
 Venice — Mandrake Linux 5.1
 Venus — AMD Opteron 100 series processors
 Venus — Mandrake Linux 6.0
 Venus — Microsoft Windows CE for WebTV (see also: Microsoft Venus)
 Venus — Skolelinux 1.0
 Venus in Furs — Adobe Photoshop 6.0
 Vermeer — Ryzen 5000
 Vernon — XMAX (XMetaL for ActiveX) 4.0 Service Pack 2
 Verne — Fedora 16 Linux
 Vertex-TX — second generation vulcan elite CPU
 Vibranium — Windows 10 version 2004
 Viking — Sun SuperSPARC chip
 VineSeed — Vine Linux current testing
 Viper — AMD-756
 Viper — Turbolinux 8.0S Beta
 Viper+ — AMD-766
 Viper — Ross Technology 64-bit SPARC processor
 Viros — DEC TOPS-20
 Virtue — Source Mage GNU/Linux 0.9.3
 Visa — Sun SPARCEngine CP2000
 Vishera — AMD's Update to Bullzoder Released Oct 2012 Bulldozer (microarchitecture))
 Vitamin — Mandrake Linux 8.1
 VLC — (Very Low Cost) Apple IIc
 VLX — Tandem NonStop 4th Generation (Later HP NonStop)
 Vostok — ASP Linux 7.3
 Voyager — Sun SuperSPARC II
 Vulcan — Seagate ST31200N

W

 Waghor — LinuxTLE 7.0
 Walkaround — Google Wave
 Wall Street — Apple Macintosh PowerBook G3
 Wallop — Microsoft project that includes blogging, filesharing, etc.
 Wally — Sun StorEdge D240
 Walrus — Sun Ultra 10 with 333 MHz
 Warm Springs — Intel WS440BX
 Warty Warthog — Ubuntu 4.10
 Water — Aurox Linux 9.2
 Watney — Sun SunForum 3.2
 Wave3 — Sun Solaris 2.6
 Weed-Whacker — Apple Macintosh IIfx
 Werewolf — Fedora 8
 Wheezey — Debian GNU/Linux 7.0
 Whidbey — Microsoft Visual Studio 2005
 Whistler — Microsoft Windows XP
 Whistler — XMetaL Author 4.0 Service Pack 1 Localized (French and German)
 Whistler Server — Microsoft Windows Server 2003
 Whitefield — Intel Xeon processors due in 2006, cancelled
 White Rabbit — Adobe Photoshop CS5
 Whitney — Intel i810 chipset
 Whopper — Seagate ST11200N
 Wide Stinger — Sun 4.2GB, 8.4GB disk card
 Widget — Arch Linux 0.6
 Wilbur — HP-9000 E35 
 Willamette — Intel Pentium 4 180 nm processor
 Wildcat — Sun high speed bus interconnect
 Wildfire — Sun parallel UltraSPARC
 Wildlife — ROCK Linux 2.0.2
 Wiley — Sun StorEdge S1
 Winchester — first floating-head disk drive, IBM, 1973
 Winchester — AMD Athlon 64 90 nm processor
 Wind — Aurox Linux 9.3
 Windermere —
 Windsor — AMD Athlon 64 X2/FX 90 nm processor (Socket AM2 w/ DDR2-800)
 Wolfack — Windows NT"Cluster Server"
 Wolfdale — code name for a processor from Intel
 Wolverine — Red Hat Linux 7.0.91
 Wombat — Arch Linux 0.7-beta1
 Wombat 33 — Apple Macintosh Quadra 800
 Wonderboy — Trustix Secure Linux 2.2-beta1
 Woodcrest — Intel Xeon 5100 series processors
 Woody — Debian GNU/Linux 3.0
 Wren4 — Seagate 4.2GB 1.6" 5400 rpm disk
 Wyoming — Sun full 64-bit version of Solaris
 Wyvern — Microsoft Windows CE 2.11, Palm-sized PC 1.2

X
 Xbox — Sun SBus Expansion Subsystem
 Xena — Sun 21" monitor
 Xenon — Microsoft Xbox 360 (successor to the Microsoft Xbox)
 XO — Apple Macintosh Classic

Y

 Yaeger — Apple Macintosh PowerBook Duo 280c
 Yamazaki — Windows Embedded CE 6.0
 Yamhill — Intel processors
 Yami — Chinese Linux Extension 0.9
 Yarrow — Fedora Core Linux 1.0
 Yarrow — Ignalum Linux 9
 Yellow Box — Apple Rhapsody development platform
 Yoda — Apple IIc
 Yonah — Intel Core Duo processor
 Yosemite — Apple Power Mac G3
 Yosemite — OS X 10.10
 Yorkfield — code name for some Intel processors sold as Core 2 Quad
 Yosemite — Sun Developer Products SPARCCompilers
 Yukon — Microsoft SQL Server 2005

Z

 Zambezi — Name of AMD processor's Core
 Zappa —
 Zebra — Sun SPARCPrinter
 Zelda — Apple IIc
 Zephyr — Sun 64-bit compilers
 Zeus — Sun developer's release of SunOS based on SVR4
 Zippy — SunVideo Plus PCI
 Zircon — Seagate ST31200WC
 Zircon II — Seagate CFP1060E
 Zeotrope — AlphaCrhome
 Zod — Fedora Core 6 Linux
 Zoltrix — Computer Electronics Brand
 Zone 5 — Apple Macintosh IIfx
 Zoot — Red Hat Linux 6.2
 Zulu — Sun 200M triangle graphics
 ZX — Sun Leo 24-bit color frame buffer
 Zydeco — Apple Macintosh Quadra 950

See also
List of Microsoft software codenames
List of Intel codenames
List of Apple codenames

References

Further reading
 Smith, Tony, (April 11, 2005), Intel confirms 'Conroe'. Retrieved April 11, 2005.

External links
 Apple Code Names - The Apple Museum
 https://web.archive.org/web/20020810221927/http://ha.redhat.com/news/UnderTheBrim.txt (dead)
 KolibriOS official site
 https://web.archive.org/web/20020620013151/http://lios.apana.org.au/~cdewick/sunshack/data/feh/1.5/wcd00000/wcd00024.htm (dead)
 DistroWatch.com
 Debian Names and Releases - Infodrom
 https://web.archive.org/web/20041009223852/http://www.miida.net.it-chiba.ac.jp/~suda/codename.html (dead)
 Microsoft Codenames List - WindowsWiki
 http://www.redhat.com/support/forums/
 http://www.powerload.fsnet.co.uk/tmeline2.htm
 FoRK Archive: Code Names Uncovered
 History of Red Hat Linux - FedoraProject
 https://archive.today/20030211015142/http://www.netops.co.uk/~steve/codenames.html (dead)

Code names
Code names